Joseph-Gaspard Dubois-Fontanelle (27 October 1727 – 15 February 1812) was an 18th–19th-century French journalist, man of letters, playwright and translator.

Biography 
Arrived in Paris where he found a patron in the person of his compatriot the abbott of Mably, he collaborated with L'Année littéraire, the Gazette des Deux-Ponts, the Gazette de France and the political department of the Mercure de France. In 1762 and 1763, he gave the Théâtre-Français two comedies with no success. He then published command works: tales, translations, philosophical tracts. The name of Dubois-Fontanelle came out of darkness when another of his plays, Éricie, ou la Vestale, fell under the scissors of censorship. Printed clandestinely, the play was presented in Lyon in 1768, resulting in the conviction of three unhappy peddlers to the galleys.

His last play, Loredan, was censored at the first performance at the Comédie-Française in 1776. He was the editor and, probably, in whole or in part, the author of the story of a shipwreck narrated by captain Pierre Viaud in 1770.

When the French Revolution broke out, Dubois-Fontanelle returned safely to his hometown, where he became professor of belles-lettres at the école centrale in the Isère department from 1796, then professor of history at the Académie de Grenoble from 1804.

Publications 
1762: Le Connaisseur, comédie en un acte et en vers
1763: Le Bon Mari, comédie en un acte et en verse
1765: Pierre le Grand, tragédy
1766: Aventures philosophiques
1768: Les Effets des passions ou Mémoires de M. de Floricourt (3 volumes)
1768: Éricie, ou la Vestale, drama in 3 acts in verse
1770: Naufrage et aventures de M. Pierre Viaud, natif de Bordeaux, capitaine de navire, histoire véritable, vérifiée sur l'attestation de M. Sevettenham, commandant du fort St. Marc des Appalaches Text online
1775: Anecdotes africaines, depuis l'origine ou la découverte des différents royaumes qui composent l'Afrique jusqu'à nos jours Text online
1776: Loredan, drama in four acts, in verse, Paris, Comédie-Française, 19 February
1781: Nouveaux mélanges sur différents sujets, contenant des essais dramatiques, philosophiques et littéraires
1785: Théâtre et œuvres philosophiques, égayés de contes nouveaux dans plus d'un genre 
1813: Cours de belles-lettres (4 volumes)
Translations
1767: Ovid: Métamorphoses (2 volumes)
1785: Agnes Maria Bennett: Anna, ou l'Héritiere galloise (4 volumes)
1788: Elizabeth Helme: Clara et Emmeline 
1798: Elias Habesci : État actuel de l'Empire ottoman (2 volumes)

Sources 
Pierre Larousse, Grand Dictionnaire universel du XIXe siècle, vol. VI, 1870, (p. 1315–1316).

References

Further reading
 Karl-Heinz Kuhn: Das französischsprachige Pressewesen im Herzogtum Pfalz-Zweibrücken (Trier, Univ., Diss., 1990; Reprint 2006).
 Josiane Quillet-Sert: Portrait de Dubois-Fontanelle (1737-1812) d'après sa correspondance (Grenoble, Thèse de doctorat, 1997).	

18th-century French journalists
18th-century French dramatists and playwrights
18th-century French writers
18th-century French male writers
French translators
Writers from Grenoble
1727 births
1812 deaths
18th-century French translators